A photoplay is a motion picture.

Photoplay may also refer to:

 Photoplay (album), 1977 album by Australian rock band Sherbet
 Photoplay (magazine), one of the first American film fan magazines, 1911–1980
 Photoplay edition, movie tie-in books in which film stills accompany a novel
 Photoplay music, incidental music written to accompany silent films
 Photoplay Productions, a British independent film company with a specialty in silent films